Scott Michael Taylor (born October 3, 1966), is a former Major League Baseball pitcher who played in  with the Texas Rangers. He batted and threw right-handed. Taylor had a 1–2 record, with a 9.39 earned run average (ERA), in three games, in his one-year career.

He attended the University of Kansas. He was drafted by the Seattle Mariners in the 15th round of the 1988 draft. He was traded from the Milwaukee Brewers to the Rangers for David Hulse on April 14, 1995. He had a 61–45 record with a 3.97 ERA in six seasons in the minor leagues at the time of the transaction.

References

External links

1966 births
Living people
Baseball players from Kansas
Sportspeople from Topeka, Kansas
Major League Baseball pitchers
Texas Rangers players
Kansas Jayhawks baseball players
Wausau Timbers players
Calgary Cannons players
Carolina Mudcats players
American expatriate baseball players in Canada
Durham Bulls players
El Paso Diablos players
Greenville Braves players
Las Vegas Stars (baseball) players
New Orleans Zephyrs players
Oklahoma City 89ers players
Rochester Red Wings players
San Bernardino Spirit players
Wichita Wranglers players
Williamsport Bills players